Bhakta Kumbara is a 1949 Indian Kannada film, directed by Bomman D. Irani and produced by Honnappa Bhagavathar. Bhagavathar also appears in the lead role alongside M. Jayashree, Lakshmi Bai, Vimalananda Das and Pandari Bai.

Cast
 Honnappa Bhagavathar
 Lakshmi Bai
 Vimalananda das
 Pandari Bai
 Murarachar
 Seetarama Sastri
 Mahabala Rao
 M. Jayashree
 Ramabai
 Lakshmamma

References

1949 films
1940s Kannada-language films
Indian black-and-white films